The 1959–60 SK Rapid Wien season was the 62nd season in club history.

Squad

Squad and statistics

Squad statistics

Fixtures and results

League

Cup

References

1959-60 Rapid Wien Season
Rapid
Austrian football championship-winning seasons